Jorge Lavat Bayona  (3 August 1933 − 14 September 2011) was a Mexican film and television actor.

Life and work
Born in Mexico City, Mexico, he appeared in more than 25 serialized telenovelas over the decades between 1958 and 2001, including his participation in Senda prohibida, the first telenovela ever produced in Mexico. He was also known for his recordings combining music and the spoken word, particularly a single he released for the essay-poem Desiderata.

He was married four times: first with Ana María Torres, then with Silvia Burgos, his third marriage was once again with Ana María Torres and finally he was the husband of the actress Rebeca Manríquez.
He had two sons and two daughters. One of them, Adriana Lavat, also became an actress. He is also related to the Mexican telenovela actress Queta Lavat, his sister, and his brother is also an actor, José Lavat.

Death
He died on September 14, 2011; after a back operation, he suffered a severe infection; he was kept in a coma and was never able to recover. He died from complications of a respiratory infection in a Mexico City hospital; his remains were cremated.

Filmography

Films

Television

References

External links

Jorge Lavat at Alma Latina

1933 births
2011 deaths
Mexican male film actors
Mexican male telenovela actors
Male actors from Mexico City